Mario Giallonardo (born September 23, 1957) is a former professional ice hockey defenceman.  He played 23 games in the National Hockey League with the Colorado Rockies between 1979 and 1981.

Career statistics

Regular season and playoffs

External links
 

1957 births
Living people
Canadian ice hockey defencemen
Colorado Rockies (NHL) players
Fort Worth Texans players
Philadelphia Firebirds (AHL) players
Toledo Goaldiggers players
Ice hockey people from Toronto
Undrafted National Hockey League players
Union Dutchmen ice hockey players
Windsor Spitfires players